Rob Powell is a political correspondent of Sky News since 2019, the 24-hour television news service operated by Sky Television, part of British Sky Broadcasting.

Career
In 2007 Powell was appointed as an intern with Bauer Media before moving to the BBC in 2010. He worked at the BBC for several years as a reporter and presenter for BBC South Daily, before joining Sky at their Westminster studio to cover the EU referendum and 2017 election. Powell is fluent in Spanish

References

External links
Official website

1988 births
Living people
Alumni of the University of Westminster
British television journalists
Sky News newsreaders and journalists